St George's, University of London (legally St George's Hospital Medical School, informally St George's  or SGUL), is a University located in Tooting in South London and is a constituent college of the University of London. St George's hospital has its origins in 1733, and began formal registration of trainee fixtures in 1751. It was the second institution in England to provide formal training courses for doctors (after the University of Oxford). St George's affiliated with the University of London soon after the latter's establishment in 1836.

St George's is closely affiliated to St George's Hospital and is one of the United Hospitals.

History

St George’s Hospital Medical School was originally established in 1733 as part of St George's Hospital at Hyde Park Corner (now the site of The Lanesborough hotel), in central London. The medical school was relocated, together with St George's Hospital to Tooting, South London in 1980. A joint faculty with Kingston University, the Faculty of Health and Social Care Sciences, has increased the variety of allied healthcare courses offered at St George's, including Nursing, Physiotherapy, Paramedic Science and Radiography.

St George's was the first institution in the United Kingdom to offer a four-year graduate entry Medicine degree based on the programme from Flinders University, with which it has an exchange programme. The first intake was in 2000 with 35 students and the course has since been emulated by many other universities. Entry to the course is highly competitive with candidates being required to sit the GAMSAT as part of the application process.

In 2008, St George's announced that it planned to merge with Royal Holloway to form a single institution within the University of London. The merger was called off in a joint statement by the two colleges' principals on 25 September 2009. St George's intends to keep working with Royal Holloway in the field of health and social care along with its well-established Joint Faculty with Kingston University. St George's, Kingston University and Royal Holloway will continue to collaborate in the field of health and social care as part of the existing SWan (South West London Academic Network) healthcare alliance.

Campus
The St George's University of London campus is located in the Tooting area of south-west London, and is co-located with St George's Hospital, a 1,300 bed major trauma centre.

Teaching facilities at the campus include clinical skills laboratories and a simulation suite allowing students to practice based on real-life situations including surgical and medical emergencies. The university library houses approximately 42,000 books and subscribes to over 10,000 journals.

Previously, the Rob Lowe Sports Centre located at the St George's Hospital grounds provided sporting facilities to students and staff, including a sports hall, three squash courts, and weights and fitness rooms. However, the site has recently been decommissioned, with only the sports hall retained. Students have used other facilities instead, including the nearby Tooting Leisure Centre.

Courses

St George's offers foundation and undergraduate degrees at its site in Tooting in medical, biomedical and healthcare sciences, including: Biomedical Science BSc (Hons), Biomedical Science Foundation Degree, Healthcare Practice DipHE and BSc (Hons), Healthcare Practice Foundation Degree, Healthcare Science (Physiological Sciences) BSc (Hons), Clinical Pharmacology BSc (Hons), Medicine (four-year graduate stream) MBBS4, Medicine (five-year) MBBS5, and Medicine (six-year) MBBS6, Physician Associate Studies MSc.

In partnership with Kingston University, the joint Faculty of Health and Social Care Sciences also offers degrees in physiotherapy, occupational therapy, paramedic science, nursing, midwifery, social work and diagnostic or therapeutic radiography.

St George's, in partnership with INTO University Partners, has also formed a joint venture, INTO SGUL, to offer a Foundation in Medical, Biomedical and Health Sciences for international students whose qualifications do not allow direct progression into Bachelors level study in the UK, and a six-year MBBS and a four-year graduate stream MBBS programme specifically for international students, with clinical placements overseas.  The first student cohort on each international MBBS programme entered St George's in September 2012.

Outside of the UK, the MBBS4 is also offered in Nicosia, Cyprus, through a partnership between St George's and the University of Nicosia. The new programme was inaugurated and the first student cohort commenced in Nicosia in September 2011.  The programme at the University of Nicosia features international clinical placements in Israel and the USA.

St George's also offers numerous research and taught postgraduate degrees.

Teaching
St George's uses the integrated approach which involves the use of both Case Based Learning (CBL), Problem Based Learning (PBL) and a traditional style of learning with the use of lectures and tutorials. The degree of PBL used in teaching varies between courses, for example, being a major part of the Medicine (Graduate Entry) course but not prominently within the Biomedical Sciences curriculum. Anatomy is taught at St George's through prosections and practical within the dissecting room, with anatomical dissection being optional as part of the Summer Dissection Programme.

In the medical curriculum, preclinical teaching (first and second year in the undergraduate stream, and first year in the graduate stream) is largely based on lectures and tutorials held at the St George's campus, with a few weeks worth of attachments to various hospital departments. The third year of the undergraduate stream and second year of the graduate stream, also known as Transitional (T) year, comprises three blocks of PBL with lectures and tutorials and three blocks of clinical placements in medicine, surgery and general practice. Subsequent clinical years of either course are spent on clinical placements of various specialities, with teaching occurring as lecture weeks prior to each placement block, or teaching which occurs at hospital sites led by clinical staff.

Clinical placements for students on Medical degrees are mainly at St. George's Hospital, and at other sites such as Kingston Hospital, Croydon University Hospital, St Helier Hospital and Epsom General Hospital. Other further sites, such as Frimley Park Hospital, St Peter's Hospital and Margate Hospital are sites for placements during the later years of medical school.

Student life

The St George's Students' Union (SGSU) organises various activities including fancy dress discos and a Rag Week, the annual series of fund-raising events. In recent years the Union has become more politically aware and shown greater interest in National Union of Students and British Medical Association activities.

Each new student at St George's is assigned a 'mum' or 'dad' in the year above. These 'parents' act as mentors for the new students, giving them advice about the course, often tutoring them when needed, as well as buying them drinks during Freshers' Week and beyond. Over the years the family expands to include siblings, uncles, aunts, grandparents etc., spanning all the years of the various courses.

St George's enters a team into the British television quiz programme University Challenge each year and has previously excelled through the competition, especially in the field of medicine - unsurprisingly.

Academic, cultural and religious societies 
There are several societies run by students at St George's focussed on several different aspects of academia, ranging from the Henry Gray Anatomical Society, St George's Surgical Society, Clinical Neuroscience Society, Cardiology Society and Paediatrics Society. Several clubs and societies cater to different segments of the student population, including cultural groups such as the Association of Chinese and British University Students (ABACUS), Afro-Caribbean Society or Arab Society. Religious groups include the Islamic Society and the Christian Union

Performance societies 
Many student groups at St George's produce yearly performances, mostly focused on dancing and singing. Some of these groups include the Diwali Show, Fashion Show, Tooting Show, St George's Revue, and the Musical Society.

Sports clubs 
St. George’s Hospital Medical School RFC is one of the oldest rugby clubs in the world having been founded in 1863.

St George's also has a number of other sports clubs including Muay Thai, swimming, rowing, cheerleading, volleyball, fencing, football, netball, hockey, and many others and participates in various competitions. As St George's is a member of the United Hospitals, the teams also compete in separate competitions with the five other medical schools within the University of London and that of Imperial College.

Halls of residence
The university runs a hall of residence, Horton Halls, a large modern site which first opened to new students in late September 2007, replacing St. George's Grove the old hall of residence.

1980s Student applications controversy 
In December 1986, it was discovered that a computer program used to process student applications at St. George's, written by Dr Geoffrey Franglen in 1979, had discriminated against non-Caucasians and female candidates by deliberately reducing their likelihood of being offered an interview. A Commission for Racial Equality inquiry found that this unfairly deprived 60 candidates a year, as well as finding that various senior academics were aware that the program was discriminatory several times between 1982 and 1986.

Notable people

Notable alumni

Notable alumni of St George's include:

 Joseph Adams (1756–1818), English physician and surgeon
 Sir Benjamin Collins Brodie (1783–1862), English physiologist and surgeon who pioneered research into bone and joint disease
 Henry Vandyke Carter (1831–1897), English anatomist, surgeon, and anatomical artist most notable for his illustrations of the book, Gray's Anatomy
 Walter Butler Cheadle (1836–1910), English paediatrician
 Sir Francis Darwin (1848–1925), botanist, son of Charles Darwin
 Sir John William Fisher (1788–1876), English surgeon
 Henry Gray FRS (1827–1861), English anatomist and surgeon most notable for publishing the book Gray's Anatomy
 Harry Hill (born 1964), English BAFTA Award-winning comedian, author and television presenter
 John Hunter (1728–1793), Scottish surgeon and anatomist
 William Hunter (1718–1783), Scottish anatomist and physician
 Edward Jenner FRS (1749–1823), English scientist and the first doctor to introduce and study the smallpox vaccine
 Nik Johnson (born 1969), Mayor of Cambridgeshire and Peterborough
 Henry Bence Jones (1813–1873), English physician, described Bence Jones protein 
 Francis Laking (1847–1914), Surgeon-Apothecary to Queen Victoria, Physician in Ordinary to King Edward VII and George V
 Christine Lee, emeritus professor of haemophilia in the University of London
 Henry Marsh (born 1950), English neurosurgeon
 Caroline Moore, UK's first woman Professor of Urology, University College London
 George Pearson FRS (1751–1858), physician, chemist and early advocate of Jenner's cowpox vaccination
 Paul Sinha (born 1970), Rose D'Or winning broadcaster and stand-up comedian
 Mike Stroud (born 1955), English physician and eminent explorer
 Patrick Steptoe FRS (1913–1988), English obstetrician, gynaecologist and pioneer of fertility treatment. Responsible for developing in vitro fertilization
 Sir Patrick Vallance FRS (born 1960), Government Chief Scientific Adviser (GCSA) and Head of the Government Science and Engineering (GSE) profession
 David Webb (born 1953), clinical vice-president, British Pharmacological Society; vice-president, Royal College of Physicians of Edinburgh
 Edward Adrian Wilson (1872–1912), English polar explorer, physician, naturalist, painter and ornithologist
 Thomas Young (1773–1829), English polymath
 Mike Wozniak, British comedian, writer and actor

Principals / Deans
 Jenny Higham (since 2015)
 Peter Kopelman (2008 to 2015)
 Michael Farthing (2003 to 2007)
 Sir Robert Boyd (1996 to 2003)
 Sir William Asscher (1988 to 1996)
 Richard J West (1982 to 1987)
 Robert Lowe (1971 to 1982)
 Alastair Hunter (1956 to 1971)

References

External links

 
 St George's Students' Union website
 Lists of St George's, University of London students
 Lists of St George's, University of London military personnel, 1914–1918

 
University of London
1733 establishments in England
Medical schools in London
Educational institutions established in 1733
United Hospitals
Buildings and structures in the London Borough of Wandsworth
Universities UK